Maria Andergast (4 June 1912 – 14 February 1995) was a German actress. She appeared in more than 60 films between 1934 and 1974.

Selected filmography

 The Prodigal Son (1934)
 Last Stop (1935)
 My Life for Maria Isabella (1935)
 The Bird Seller (1935)
 Scandal at the Fledermaus (1936)
 His Daughter is Called Peter (1936)
 The Three Around Christine (1936)
 Three Girls for Schubert (1936)
 The Czar's Courier (1936)
 The Mystery of Betty Bonn (1938)
 Monika (1938)
 Immortal Waltz (1939)
 Der Herr im Haus (1940)
 The Big Game (1942)
 Der Hofrat Geiger (1947)
 No Sin on the Alpine Pastures (1950)
 The Midnight Venus (1951)
 The Spendthrift (1953)
 The Bachelor Trap (1953)
 The Crazy Clinic (1954)
 When the Alpine Roses Bloom (1955)
 Emperor's Ball (1956)
 Engagement at Wolfgangsee (1956)
 Almenrausch and Edelweiss (1957)
 Stolen Heaven (1974)

References

External links

1912 births
1995 deaths
People from Altötting (district)
People from the Kingdom of Bavaria
German film actresses
20th-century German actresses